Pooja Sharma born 15 December 1984 is representative for India in the sport of Kabaddi. She was a member of the kabaddi team that won a gold medal in the 2010 Asian games in Guangzhou.

References

Living people
1984 births
Indian kabaddi players
Asian Games medalists in kabaddi
Kabaddi players at the 2010 Asian Games
Asian Games gold medalists for India
Medalists at the 2010 Asian Games